Allium qasyunense is a Middle Eastern species of onions in the amaryllis family, found in Israel, Palestine, Syria and Jordan. It is a bulb-forming perennial with an umbel of cream-colored flowers.

References

qasyunense
Onions
Plants described in 1953